Gottschalk (Gosche) von Ahlefeldt ( – 25 January 1541 in Bollingstedt) was the last Catholic Bishop of Schleswig.

Life 
Gottschalk von Ahlefeldt was born in 1475, the son of Claus von Ahlefeldt. At the age of 14, he was enrolled at the University of Rostock. There he studied canon law and became a canon and Thesaurarius in 1497. He then went to Italy to continue his studies and stayed in Rome for some time. In 1498 Gottschalk enrolled at the University of Bologna and returned to Schleswig in 1501 as a doctor of canon law.

Due to his education in Bologna and his descent from the Ahlefeldt family, he was employed as chancellor at the court of Duke Frederick I. In 1506, Gottschalk von Ahlefeldt took over the cathedral provostship at Schleswig Cathedral and became bishop on 21 May 1507, succeeding Detlev von Pogwisch elected in Schleswig. In him one suspects "the intellectual mind behind the works of Hans Brüggemann".

The Reformation began during his term. Since he did not oppose the Reformation, he remained in possession of the episcopal estates until his death on his Bollingstedt estate on 25 January 1541. Tilemann von Hussen was appointed the first evangelical bishop of Schleswig after Johannes Bugenhagen had rejected this office.

Gottschalk Ahlefeldt is buried in Schleswig Cathedral.

Literature 
 Ernst Friedrich Mooyer: Zur Chronologie schleswigscher Bischöfe. In: Jahrbücher für die Landeskunde der Herzogthümer Schleswig. Band 2 (1859), S. 15 ff. (Digitalisat in der Google-Buchsuche).
 Louis von Ahlefeldt, Wulf August von Rumohr Drüllt: Die Schleswig-Holsteinische Ritterschaft. Ein Beitrag zur Adelsgeschichte Deutschlands und Dänemarks. Heft 1: Die Familie von Ahlefeldt. Heiberg, Schleswig 1869, S. 11 (Digitalisat).
 
 Leopold von Zedlitz-Neukirch: Neues preussisches Adels-Lexicon oder genealogische und diplomatische Nachrichten. Band 1 (1836), S. 87.
 Friedrich Wilhelm Bautz: von Ahlefeldt, Gottschalk. In: Biographisch-Bibliographisches Kirchenlexikon (BBKL). Band 1, Bautz, Hamm 1975. 2.,
 unveränderte Auflage Hamm 1990, ISBN 3-88309-013-1, Sp. 66.

External links 

 Biography at catholic-hierarchy.org

1475 births
1541 deaths
16th-century Roman Catholic bishops
Bishops of Schleswig
People from Schleswig-Holstein
House of Ahlefeldt